

The Rollei 35 S is a compact 35 mm film camera designed by Heinz Waaske and made by the German camera maker Rollei, in their Singapore factory. It uses a Zeiss-licensed collapsible f2,8/40mm Sonnar lens. From most conventional cameras it differs by having an electronic flash hot shoe on the bottom.

A Rollei 35 S is featured extensively in the anime series Tamayura, where it is used by the main character.

Specifications

Format: 35mm
Lens: Rollei HFT Sonnar 40/2,8
Shutter speeds: 1/2 – 1/500 + B
ISO setting: 25–1600
Match needle metering system
Metric/feet scale focus

Notes

External links
RolleiClub
Club Rollei User - aClub for all users, collectors and enthusiasts of Rollei photography

35andnbsp;S